Progressive Pickin' is the twenty-fifth studio album by guitarist Chet Atkins.

Track listing

Side one
 "Gravy Waltz" (Steve Allen, Ray Brown) – 3:04
 "Love Letters" (Edward Heyman, Victor Young) – 2:30
 "Early Times" (Jerry Reed) – 2:37
 "Satan's Doll" (Johnny Smith) – 3:50
 "Summertime" (George Gershwin, Ira Gershwin, Heyward) – 2:57

Side two
 "Kicky" (Jerry Reed) – 2:18
 "Jordu" (Duke Jordan) – 3:15
 "I Remember You" (Johnny Mercer, Victor Schertzinger) – 3:35
 "Bluesette" (Toots Thielemans) – 3:15
 "So Rare" (Jerry Herst, Jack Sharpe) – 3:02

Personnel
Chet Atkins – guitar
Henry Strzelecki - bass
Bill Pursell - piano
Buddy Harman - drums
Chuck Seitz - recording engineer

References

1964 albums
Chet Atkins albums
Albums produced by Bob Ferguson (music)
RCA Victor albums